Gigwise is a British online music news site that features music news, photos, album reviews, music festivals, concert tickets and video content. Founded in June 2001, the site is based in London, England.

History
Gigwise was launched in 2001 in Liverpool as a gig listings site. Over time, the site evolved into a music news site including reviews and interviews in its content. In 2006, the site relocated its main office to London. It was the UK's 20th most-visited music news website in Dec 2010 ranking above NME.COM in the comScore reports.

Gigwise was acquired in 2016 by the team behind Second Screen  and Techtonic.

For the 20th Anniversary, Gigwise published its first ever print edition  in July 2021 featuring Self Esteem on the front cover.

Editors
 Andy Day (2002–05)
 Scott Colothan (2005–09)
 Jason Gregory (2009–11)
 Michael Baggs (2011–14)
 Andy Morris (2014–15)
 Andrew Trendell (2015–2016) 
 Cai Trefor (2016–19)
 Shannon Cotton (2019–20)
 Jessie Atkinson (2020–22)
 Lucy Harbron (2022-)

Partnerships
Gigwise hosted the Indie Idle band competition for the Camden Crawl festival in 2007, 2008 and 2009. Gigwise also launched Snowbombing festival's King of the Mountain unsigned band competition in 2009. The winning band, I Am Austin, won €2000 and a headline slot at the festival. In April 2011, Gigwise launched a monthly club night at XOYO with Young Knives playing an album launch. Gigwise also had their own arena at the June 2011 Get Loaded In The Park in London. The acts appearing at the Gigwise Stage were Yelle, O Children, Darwin Deez, Babeshadow, and Alpines. In May 2011, Liverpool Sound City also hosted a Gigwise stage at the O2 Academy Liverpool with Scottish rockers The View headlining.
In 2018, Gigwise collaborated with Romania's Electric Castle Festival, and in 2019, partnered with Mophie mobile to bring exclusive content from Isle of Wight Festival. In 2020, the site hosted a virtual stage at the first ever digital SXSW Festival.

Redesign and relaunch
In 2011, Giant Digital in-house designers and developers began a redesign of Gigwise with the objective to create a visually simplified appearance. The site redefined its usability to accompany a new generation of users. Web Designer Michael Pumo at Branch told Music Week the new design is "bold, unpretentious and straight-forward" and that improvements will increase usability on touch devices like the Apple iPad.

As the site changed hands again in 2016, Gigwise was once again updated for desktop and mobile. Relaunched with its freshest look to date in 2021 - to coincide with the site's twentieth anniversary - the latest redesign reflects a diversification of Gigwise into genres of all kinds, away from the indie focus of old.

Giant Digital Ltd

Gigwise is one of six sister sites which were also launched as part of the Giant Digital network; Other sites include Entertainmentwise, Popdash, Taletela, Tellygossip, and in 2011 Muveez with Alex Winehouse, brother of Amy Winehouse, serving as Chief Editor. Gigwise hosted the "best song" award at the BT Digital Music Awards at the Camden Roundhouse, where the winner was Jessie J's "Price Tag" featuring B.o.B. In 2012 Gigwise became of the two only media partners for the Strummer Of Love festival held in Somerset in aid of the late Joe Strummer with all the proceeds going to the Strummerville charity which helps young people in music who would not normally get opportunities in music.

2013 Music Week Awards nomination

Gigwise was nominated in the 'Best Music Media Brand' category of the 2013 Music Week awards.

References

External links 
 

Online music magazines published in the United Kingdom
Internet properties established in 2001